Richard Milton (born 1943) is a British journalist and amateur archaeologist. An engineer by training, Milton has written on the topics of popular history, business, and alternative science, and published one novel.

Books
The Facts of Life: Shattering the Myths of Darwinism is a non-religious creationist attack on evolutionary biology, following the arguments of "creation science". It presents an "idiosyncratic collection of scientific anomalies purported to support the fallacies of Darwinism", referencing fringe figures such as Rupert Sheldrake.

In a review in Third Way Douglas Spanner, while suggesting that it should be taken seriously by orthodox Darwinism, was dubious about his attempts to dispute traditional methods of estimating the earth's age and said "on matters of biological importance he can be off-course at times".

His books, especially those on scientific controversies, have been roundly rejected. To his critics Milton is a contrarian who engages in controversy for its own sake, while to his supporters he is a writer unafraid to tackle uncomfortable subjects and orthodoxies that have become dogmas. Milton is shunned in the field of evolution as he is a neo-Lamarckian who has supported the experiments of Paul Kammerer.

The Facts of Life was met with intense criticism from many mainstream academic reviewers. Reviewing it in the New Statesman, Oxford evolutionary biologist Richard Dawkins described it as "twaddle that betrays, on almost every page, complete and total pig-ignorance of the subject at hand", characterising its central thesis as being as silly as "a claim that the Romans never existed and the Latin language is a cunning Victorian fabrication to keep schoolmasters employed".

Milton's claims have been criticised as pseudoscience by philosophy professor Robert Carroll. Milton appeared on The Mysterious Origins of Man, a television special arguing that mankind has lived on the Earth for tens of millions of years, and that mainstream scientists have suppressed supporting evidence.

Milton's claims on the age of mankind have also been criticised for scientific inaccuracy.

Reviewing Forbidden Science: Suppressed Research That Could Change Our Lives in New Scientist, Harry Collins was generally positive about much of the book but criticised Milton's failure to "draw a line between what might be worth a shot and what
is simply daft":

Collins concluded: "unlike Milton, I cannot see the scientific point of Kirlian photography or the theory of the hollow Earth, however interesting they are to sociologists".

Works

Nonfiction
 
 published as Il Mystero Della Vita, Editoriale Armenia, 1993 (Italy)
 published by Sinkosha Publishing, 1995 (Japan)
 
 published as O Mythos tou Darwinismou 1996 (Greece), Park Street Press, 1997 (US Hardback, US Paperback)
 published by Forepace Publishing, 1997 (Thailand)
 
 published as Verbotene Wissenschaften, Zweitausendeins, 1996 (Germany)
 published as Verbotene Wissenschaften, Kopp Verlag, 2014 (Germany)

Fiction

See also
 James Le Fanu

References

External links
 Debate on fossil hominid evidence between Richard Milton and Jim Foley, TalkOrigins Archive

British male journalists
1943 births
Living people